The 2017–18 Toulouse FC season is the 48th professional season of the club since its creation in 1970.

Players

French teams are limited to four players without EU citizenship. Hence, the squad list includes only the principal nationality of each player; several non-European players on the squad have dual citizenship with an EU country. Also, players from the ACP countries—countries in Africa, the Caribbean, and the Pacific that are signatories to the Cotonou Agreement—are not counted against non-EU quotas due to the Kolpak ruling.

First team squad

Out on loan

Transfers

Transfers in

Loans in

Transfers out

Loans out

Competitions

Ligue 1

League table

Results summary

Results by round

Matches

Relegation Play Off

Coupe de France

Coupe de la Ligue

References

Toulouse FC
Toulouse FC seasons